The Sunfish is a personal-size, beach-launched sailing dinghy. It features a very flat, boardlike hull carrying an Oceanic lateen sail  mounted to an un-stayed mast.

Sunfish was developed by Alcort, Inc. and first appeared around 1952 as the "next generation" improvement on their original boat, the Sailfish. In contrast, the Sunfish has a wider beam for more stability, increased freeboard and the addition of a foot-well for a more comfortable sailing position. Sunfish began as a wood hull design and progressed to fiberglass construction just a few years after its introduction.

Having a Lateen sail with its simple two line rigging makes a Sunfish simple to learn sailing on and to set up. Upgrades can be added to enhance sail control for competitive sailing, making the boat attractive to both novice and experienced sailors alike.

Due to the broad appeal of the Sunfish, in 1995 it was commended by The American Sailboat Hall of Fame for being "the most popular fiberglass boat ever designed, with a quarter million sold worldwide" (at that point in time).

Early in 2016, manufacturer Laser Performance moved production from Portsmouth, Rhode Island, US to China and boats were supplied to the 2016 World Championships.

In 2017, Laser Performance (LP) announced the creation of a new governing body to manage the Sunfish Class, the International Sunfish Class Organization (ISCO), after the International Sunfish Class Association (ISCA), governing body since 1969, refused to sign a trademark agreement. In response the ISCA, still the World Sailing recognised Class Association, have announced rule changes which permit alternative suppliers to Laser Performance for some components.

Today, the Sunfish brand-name has become so widely known it is often misapplied generically to refer to any brand of board-style boat sporting the characteristic crab claw sail. The design is currently manufactured by Laser Performance.

Design
The distinctive low-aspect ratio Lateen sail gives the Sunfish an anachronistic appearance compared with today's more familiar high-aspect ratio Bermuda rig sailboats. However, this sail plan is not as old-world as it might first appear. Using a lateen rig for this style boat shifts the advantage toward better performance in lighter air (less than 4 on the Beaufort scale) and contributes to it having good down-wind characteristics.

The hull’s very mild "V" bottom and hard chine make Sunfish a most stable boat for its size, along with enabling it to sail on a plane (hydroplane). Planing allows the boat to achieve a speed greater than theoretical hull speed based on length at waterline (LWL). Having a down-wind performance advantage helps the Sunfish to achieve a planing attitude at lower wind speeds than its high-aspect ratio sail plan counterparts.

Designed as a water-tight, hollow-body pontoon, a hull like the Sunfish has is sometimes referred to as "self-rescuing" because the boat can be capsized and its cockpit swamped without threat of the boat sinking.

History

Beginnings of Alcort, Inc.
In 1945, Alex Bryan and Cortlandt Heyniger created the Alcort company to produce their first boat design, the Sailfish. Originally framing carpenters by trade, these two entrepreneurs began their sailcraft endeavors building iceboats as a sideline. A proposal to build a lifesaving paddleboard for the Red Cross came their way. They determined the concept unfeasible as it stood. An improved design sporting a sailing canoe sail rig did however strike a spark as a possible profit making venture. From that humble beginning the Sailfish was born. After Bryan's wife, Aileen Bryan suggested a boat with a small cockpit where she could put her feet, the design was updated to the Sunfish.

The kit boat niche
The first Sailfish were offered in the form of detailed drawings for the backyard builder or as a finished, ready-to-sail boat, built by the Alcort shop. In the course of growing their business, Cortlandt and Alex had the revelation to kit the boat by supplying pre-cut pieces, all the necessary fittings, and inclusion of the sail thereby making backyard construction more appealing to an even wider range of would-be boat builders. Sunfish first appeared as either a DIY kit or a finished boat. Of the two designs, only the Sailfish was originally a blueprint plan boat.

Waypoints
 For the 1960 model year, Sunfish became available in a fiberglass version for the first time. Alcort shop-built wood boats were phased out around the same period, however, the Sunfish kit boat remained available through the late 1960s.
 1971 found a storage compartment added to the rear of the cockpit.
 1972 model saw a revision of the rudder blade's shape, the rudder's gudgeon and pintle, a new shape daggerboard, and a switch to a Sunfish designed cockpit bailer. This was a turning point for those pieces of equipment, thereafter referred as "New Style" by owners of Sunfish from that era.
 Every few years, hardware and sometimes cosmetics and/or sail colors evolve, adding a piece or two of something more contemporary to replace outdated technology or style.
 In 1969, when AMF took over Sunfish production from Alcort, Inc., one of the expansion strategies was to form the Sunfish (racing) Class Association to help promote the boat through organized sailing competition.
 In 1989 the fused deck to hull joint was changed from a ½" flat lip protected by an aluminum trim strip to the increased surface area of a rounded gunwale, now more securely bonded using a methacrylate adhesive specially suited for fiberglass.
 Sail geometry has changed on a couple of occasions, most significantly in 1989 when the "Racing Sail", still 75 ft² "sail area", but with deeper draft, was made available as an option.
 In 2010 the last of the Sunfish's wood attributes were superseded when first the rudder and now this year the tiller were changed from wood components to fiberglass and aluminum respectively.
 The Sunfish was inducted into the American Sailboat Hall of Fame in 1995.
 Since its introduction in 1952, Sunfish has come under the stewardship of seven successive builders (see Sunfish Builder Chronology below).

Sunfish Builder Chronology

Sunfish in racing

For most One-Design Class eligible boats, the number of boats built and the number of boats registered in the racing class are closely related. This makes the boat and the racing Class practically one and the same. The Sunfish is an anomaly to this more familiar symbiotic relationship.

The Sunfish Class Association reported in 2001, Sunfish production had exceeded 300,000 boats. The registrar for One Design sailing in the United States, US Sailing, reported in a 2004 survey, Sunfish Class membership numbered 1,573. This does not mean Sunfish isn’t a preferred race boat. On the contrary, at 1,573 Class members, Sunfish ranks in the upper percentile of boats involved with organized racing in the U.S. It does, however, demonstrate the boat’s above average versatility to suit a broader range of sailing applications.

Fun racing
Recreational, "friendly competition" played a key role in establishing the renowned popularity of the Alcort boat designs. Events of past and present, such as the Connecticut River race, Seattle's Duck Dodge, and the Hampton Roads Sunfish Challenge & Dinghy Distance Race, now in its 10th year, serve as examples of the sort of fun Sunfish sailors have without getting too serious.

Open Class Racing
Sunfish sailors who are more serious about sailing competitions, but who do not have the advantage of a nearby Sunfish fleet, can race their boat against nearly any other make and model of sailboat in "Open Class" events using a handicap system. Sunfish have a base-line Portsmouth handicap of 99.6.

One-Design Racing (ISCA)
One Design racing uses nearly identical boats so the competition is based purely on sailing skill. One Design Classes are watched over by a governing body who assure conformity.

The International Sunfish Class Association – development

 In 1969 AMF was instrumental in forming the Sunfish (racing) Class Association.
 In 1984 the Sunfish Class became recognized by the International Yacht Racing Union,
 today known as the International Sailing Federation (ISAF).
 A year later the Sunfish Class went independent as the International Sunfish Class Association (ISCA)
 Sunfish gained Pan American Games status in 1999 and has maintained recognition in following years
 International Masters was held outside the United States, in the Netherlands, for the first time in 2005.
 There are three continental and nine national championships regularly.
 Sunfish fleets are active in 28 countries around the globe.

Sunfish 60th Anniversary
To celebrate 60 years of Sunfish, current builder Laser Performance designed a 60th Anniversary edition of the Sunfish to celebrate the diverse history of the boat and the sailors that love it. LaserPerformance also hosted a Sunfish 60th Anniversary Celebration at Noyes Pond in Massachusetts, the home of Sunfish designer Al Bryan, that gathered over 100 people sailing old and new Sunfish.

Super Sunfish

In the 1960s, a member of the New Canaan, Conn. Sunfish Fleet, John Black Lee, independently experimented with a conventional sail rig for the Sunfish. He developed a high-aspect ratio sail that worked on the Sunfish hull and christened his design the Formula S. The high aspect ratio sail plan has better upwind performance characteristics over the lateen sail, changing the boat's handling to point more like other Bermuda rig sailboats in its size. With this configuration, complexity of sail control is elevated by the addition of dynamic outhaul, downhaul, and mainsheet traveller lines.

Lee's concept didn't interest Alcort, Inc. as a production model so he refit conversion boats independently and sparked organization of Formula S fleets. A few years after their 1969 purchase of Alcort, Inc., AMF revisited the idea of a high aspect ratio rig for the Sunfish. AMF did not choose to adopt Lee's Formula S design, they did however, develop their own variation calling it the Super Sunfish. The existing Formula S fleet eventually became assimilated into the ranks of AMF Super Sunfish fleets.

The Super Sunfish was available from 1974 to 1984. AMF marketed this more conventional sail plan as a performance version of the Sunfish in an attempt to compete with, among others, the newly emerging Laser. Portsmouth handicap numbers, however, place the Laser slightly faster. With its hard chine hull, the Super Sunfish is the more stable boat so it's a tradeoff between the two designs.

The Super Sunfish was offered as a complete package and as a kit to retrofit existing lateen rigged Sunfish. The literature points out the sail systems can be easily swapped on a single Sunfish hull to accommodate different sailors' preferences.

Events

World Championship

References

1950s sailboat type designs
Single-handed sailing
 
Dinghies
Sailboat types built by LaserPerformance